Valdefuentes de Sangusín is a municipality located in the province of Salamanca, Castile and León, Spain.  As of 2016 it has a population of 229 people.

References

Municipalities in the Province of Salamanca